Herbert Mason Sears was a noted yachtsman and businessman in Boston, Massachusetts. He was awarded the Croix de Guerre for his contributions during World War I.

Family 

He was born into a prominent New England family, a Mayflower descendant of the Sawyer family line. He was the son of Fredrick Sears and Albertina (Shelton) Sears, and grandson of David Sears, the developer of Longwood. His twin brother was sculptor Phillip Sears and his older brother was professional tennis player Richard Sears.

He married Caroline Bartlett (1870-1908) in 1891, and had two daughters with her, Elizabeth (1892-1969) and Phyllis (1895-1964). Sears became widowed in 1908 after his wife Caroline would tragically take her life at the St. Regis Hotel in New York City. His daughter Phyllis would go on to marry Bayard Tuckerman Jr., a horseman and one of the founders of Suffolk Downs race track in East Boston. His grandson was politician Herbert Sears Tuckerman.

Business 
After graduating from Harvard, he was a partner at the stockbrokers Curtis & Motley, and later would be president of Fifty Associates, vice president of Suffolk Savings Bank, and a director of the New England Trust Company and Boston and Albany Railroad.

Yachtsman 
Herbert Sears was an avid yachtsman and commodore of the Eastern Yacht Club in Marblehead, Massachusetts from 1914 to 1923, and continued to be a life-long prominent member. He owned the steam yacht Augusta, and had the sloop Alert built in 1902, which was designed by Nathaniel Herreshoff.

Sears' pride however, would be the schooner yacht Constellation, designed by Edward Burgess and originally built for E.D. Morgan. He purchased it in 1914, and as commodore of the Eastern Yacht Club, the Constellation would serve as the flagship, leading the fleet in all club races and regattas until it was scrapped for the war effort in 1941.He was painted in 1924 by John Singer Sargent in the painting "On the Deck of the Yacht Constellation". In 1921, Sears created the "Sears Cup", bearing his name, for competition among juniors of Massachusetts yacht clubs.

World War I contributions 
When the United States entered the war, Sears as Commodore of the Eastern Yacht Club, called the Under Secretary of the Navy, Franklin Roosevelt, and offered the use of the Eastern clubhouse in Marblehead to the Navy as a base. Roosevelt accepted and the clubhouse was used as a training station for the first year of World War I, primarily for training ashore and aviation training.

Sears, along with other members of the Eastern Yacht Club, sponsored and privately financed the construction of Navy patrol boats for the war effort known as "The Eastern Yacht Club 62 footers". The boats were designed by Albert Loring Swasey and Nathanael Greene Herreshoff, with the Sears-sponsored boat named the USS Commodore (SP-1425).

In 1917, at the age of 50, he would volunteer and spend eight months at the front in France near Dixmude, serving as part of the American Red Cross. For his efforts he would receive the Croix de Guerre and the medal of Reconnaissance Francaise. After returning from France, his wrote of his experience in the book Journal of a Canteen Worker: A Record of Service with the American Red Cross.

Notable residences 
Herbert Sears' primary Boston residence was on 287 Commonwealth Ave., designed by the architecture firm Rotch and Tilden. He had it constructed for him and his wife Caroline in 1892, and he would continue to live there until his death in 1942. He also had an estate named "Woodrock" in Beverly, Massachusetts at 400 Hale Street, Prides Crossing. It is now part of Endicott College and is named Reynolds Hall.

References 

Recipients of the Croix de Guerre 1914–1918 (France)
Harvard University alumni
People from Marblehead, Massachusetts
1867 births
1942 deaths
People from Back Bay, Boston